Abacus is a peer-reviewed quarterly academic journal published by Wiley-Blackwell on behalf of the Accounting Foundation (University of Sydney). It was established in 1965. The editor-in-chief is Stewart Jones (University of Sydney) and Baljit K. Sidhu (University of Sydney). According to the Journal Citation Reports, the journal has a 2021 impact factor of 2.060.

References

Accounting journals
Publications established in 1965
English-language journals
Quarterly journals
Wiley-Blackwell academic journals